Thomas Evans (ca. 1755February 12, 1815) was an eighteenth- and nineteenth-century congressman and lawyer from Virginia.

Biography
Born in Accomack County, Virginia, Evans attended the College of William and Mary. He studied law and was admitted to the bar. He was a member of the Virginia House of Delegates in 1780, 1781 and from 1794 to 1796. Evans was later elected a Federalist to the United States House of Representatives in 1796, serving from 1797 to 1801. There, he was appointed one of the managers to conduct the impeachment proceedings against Tennessee Senator William Blount in 1798. In 1802, Evans moved to Wheeling, Virginia (now West Virginia) and once again became a member of the House of Delegates, serving in 1805 and 1806. He died in 1815.

External links

Thomas Evans at The Political Graveyard
Death Notice

1750s births
1815 deaths
People from Accomack County, Virginia
Members of the Virginia House of Delegates
Virginia lawyers
College of William & Mary alumni
Politicians from Wheeling, West Virginia
Federalist Party members of the United States House of Representatives from Virginia
Lawyers from Wheeling, West Virginia